The women's 500 metres competition at the 2020 European Speed Skating Championships was held on 11 January 2020.

Results
The race was started at 13:40.

References

Women's 500 metres